Hartlebury railway station serves the village of Hartlebury in Worcestershire, England. All trains serving the station are operated by West Midlands Trains. The station is unstaffed and is about half a mile to the east of the village. Hartlebury is the least-used station in Worcestershire.

Details and history
Hartlebury station was opened by the Oxford, Worcester and Wolverhampton Railway in 1852, and from 1862 it served as the starting point of the Severn Valley Railway, which ran to Shrewsbury in Shropshire, a distance of 40 miles. Through passenger trains over this route ended in September 1963, but local workings to Stourport-on-Severn &  continued until January 1970 and coal trains to the power station at Stourport until 1979.  The branch has since been lifted, though its formation can still be seen.

The original station had an overbridge and canopies but these were removed in the 1960s, during a period of rationalisation on the railways, and crossing the platforms must now be done via the road. As the old station building is now a pub/restaurant, waiting passengers are provided with bus shelter-style structures to shelter from the elements. Due to the station having short platforms longer trains cannot stop here.

After being used by a marine engineering company, the old station building is currently being redeveloped as a micro-brewery, pub and restaurant.

There is a level crossing at the north end of the station, formerly operated by Hartlebury Station Box (to the north of the crossing) but now worked remotely from the West Midlands Signalling Centre at Saltley.

Hartlebury Station Box was an example of the second signal box design from McKenzie & Holland of Worcester, and became operational in 1876. A further signal box, Hartlebury Junction, previously existed at the junction of the Severn Valley line, but was demolished after the closure of the line rendered the box redundant.

Services

Up until the December 2013 timetable change the service from the station to both Birmingham and Worcester was limited, especially outside of the morning and evening peak periods. From 9 December 2013 however, the station gained an hourly service in each direction between 06:40 and 20:07 Mondays to Saturdays. A few additional later evening trains also called at Hartlebury after this time.

In the December 2022 timetable, the first of there morning trains on weekdays leaving Hartlebury towards Dorridge via Snow Hill and  departs at 05:45 with the first towards  via  departing at 07:42, with an hourly service towards  throughout the day.

A normal weekday service operates on most bank holidays.

Notes

Further reading

External links

Rail Around Birmingham and the West Midlands: Hartlebury station

Railway stations in Worcestershire
DfT Category F2 stations
Former Great Western Railway stations
Railway stations in Great Britain opened in 1852
Railway stations served by West Midlands Trains
1852 establishments in England